Nessia hickanala, also known as the shark-headed snake skink and Hickanala nessia, is a species of skink endemic to island of Sri Lanka.

Description
Midbody scales rows 2–21. Body is elongated and limbless. Head flattened, wedge-shaped. Eyes greatly reduced. Lower eyelid comprising three transparent scales. Ears are small. Dorsal scales enlarged. Dorsum and venter are pinkish brown. Scales dark brown.

Distribution and habitat
A fossorial skink, known only from the dry North West. One specimen was found from a depth of 6 cm under a heap of coconut branches at Pomparippu, Snout 8 km from the coast. Species is also known from Wilpattu National Park.

Ecology and diet
Inhabits lowlands, under 50m.

Reproduction
2 eggs are laid in loose soil.

References

Nessia
Reptiles of Sri Lanka
Endemic fauna of Sri Lanka
Reptiles described in 1940
Taxa named by Paulus Edward Pieris Deraniyagala